Jean-Philippe Jodard (born July 8, 1966 in Auxerre) is a retired male beach volleyball player from France, who competed in two consecutive Summer Olympics for his native country, starting in 1996. He became the first official European champion in men's beach volleyball, when he won the title in 1993 alongside Christian Penigaud.

Playing partners
 Christian Penigaud
 Ivan Douenel
 Eric Bouvier
 Gregory Znatchkowsky

References

External links
 
 
 
 

1966 births
Living people
French beach volleyball players
Men's beach volleyball players
Beach volleyball players at the 1996 Summer Olympics
Beach volleyball players at the 2000 Summer Olympics
Olympic beach volleyball players of France
Sportspeople from Auxerre